Mount Burnett is a small country town and bounded locality located approximately  from Melbourne, in Victoria, Australia, located within the Shire of Cardinia local government area. Mount Burnett recorded a population of 180 at the 2021 census.

The town has no post office or town centre. Most of the town is either farmland or rural housing. The town shares its postcode (3781) with neighbouring town Cockatoo.

History
Gembrook West Post Office opened on 1 January 1885, was renamed Mount Burnett in 1921 and closed in 1978.

See also
 Shire of Pakenham – Mount Burnett was previously within this former local government area.
 Mount Burnett Observatory

References

Towns in Victoria (Australia)
Shire of Cardinia